Abe Most (February 27, 1920 – October 10, 2002) was a swing clarinetist and alto saxophonist who is known for his performances and recordings of the works of Artie Shaw and Benny Goodman. He began his career in 1939 as a member of Les Brown's big band. After serving three years in the US Army during World War II from 1942-1945, he became a member of Tommy Dorsey's big band.

Most made a few albums with smaller labels, including Superior (1946), Trend (1954), Annunciata (1978) and Camard (1984). His last two albums were Abe Most Live! (1994) and I Love You Much Too Much (2007). He was a studio musician for seven decades, playing on albums by Earth, Wind & Fire, Ted Gärdestad, Dick Haymes, Joni Mitchell, Randy Newman, and Dory Previn among others. He can also be heard playing on the soundtrack of the film How to Marry a Millionaire. He is the older brother of jazz musician Sam Most.

Discography

As leader
 Mister Clarinet (Liberty, 1955)
 Swing Low Sweet Clarinet (Camard, 1984)
 Live! (Camard, 1995)

As sideman
With Les Brown
 Sunday, Out of Nowhere (Columbia, 1944)
 The Les Brown Story (Capitol, 1959)
 The Uncollected Les Brown and His Orchestra 1949 Vol. 2 (Hindsight, 1978)

With Dominic Frontiere
 Dom Frontiere Sextet (Liberty, 1955)
 Fabulous!! (Liberty, 1956)

With Henry Mancini
 Mancini Concert (RCA Victor, 1971)
 Hangin' Out (RCA Victor, 1974)

With others
 Van Alexander, The Home of Happy Feet (Capitol, 1959)
 Laurindo Almeida, New Directions (Crystal Clear, 1979)
 Cher, Stars (Warner Bros., 1975)
 Ray Conniff, Friendly Persuasion (CBS/Columbia, 1964)
 Craig Doerge, Craig Doerge (Columbia, 1973)
 The Dorsey Brothers, The Fabulous Dorsey Brothers 1946 (Sunbeam, 1975)
 Earth, Wind & Fire, All 'n All (Columbia, 1977)
 Ted Gardestad, Blue Virgin Isles (Polar, 1978)
 B.B. King, Midnight Believer (ABC, 1978)
 Peggy Lee, Mirrors (A&M, 1975)
 Jakob Magnusson, Special Treatment (Warner Bros., 1979)
 Johnny Mandel, I Want to Live (United Artists, 1958)
 Freddy Martin, Salute to the Smooth Bands Vol. 2 (Capitol, 1964)
 Carmen McRae, Can't Hide Love (Blue Note, 1976)
 Liza Minnelli, New York, New York (United Artists, 1977)
 Joni Mitchell, Hejira (Asylum, 1976)
 Maria Muldaur, Waitress in a Donut Shop (Reprise, 1974)
 Lyle Murphy, 12-Tone Compositions & Arrangements (Contemporary, 1955)
 Randy Newman, Sail Away (Reprise, 1972)
 Dave Pell, The Big Small Bands (Capitol, 1960)
 Dory Previn, Reflections in a Mud Puddle, Taps Tremors and Time Steps (United Artists, 1971)
 George Shearing, Out of the Woods (Capitol, 1964)
 Paul Smith, Liquid Sounds Part 2 (Capitol, 1954)
 John Williams, 1941 (Arista, 1979)

References

1920 births
2002 deaths
Jazz alto saxophonists
Big band saxophonists
American jazz saxophonists
American male saxophonists
American jazz clarinetists
20th-century American saxophonists
20th-century American male musicians
American male jazz musicians